Science Faxtion is an American experimental metal band that formed in California in 2007. Comprising multi-instrumentalist and vocalist Bootsy Collins, vocalist and guitarist Greg Hampton, guitarist Buckethead, drummer Bryan "Brain" Mantia and DJ Tobe "Tobotius" Donohue (also known as DJ Botieus), the band has released the album Living on Another Frequency in October 2008.

Band members
Bootsy Collins – bass, vocals, keyboards, guitar
Greg Hampton – vocals, guitar
Buckethead – guitar, bass
Bryan "Brain" Mantia – drums, programming
Tobe "Tobotius" Donohue – turntables, Drums, programming & engineering
Bernie Worrell, another P-Funk alumnus, appears on this album as well, but not as a band member

Discography
Living on Another Frequency (2008)

References

External links
Science Faxtion on Myspace

Heavy metal musical groups from California
Buckethead